Layers is the debut studio album written and conducted by French DJ and record producer Kungs. It was released in France on 4 November 2016 by House of Barclay. The album peaked at number 8 on the French Albums Chart. The album includes the singles "This Girl", "Don't You Know", "I Feel So Bad" and "You Remain".

Singles
 "This Girl" was released as the lead single from the album on 19 February 2016. It is a remix of Cookin' on 3 Burners' original song with vocals by Kylie Auldist. The song peaked at number one on the French Singles Chart.
 "Don't You Know" was released as the second single from the album on 24 June 2016. The song peaked at number 5 on the French Singles Chart.
 "I Feel So Bad" was released as the third single from the album on 19 October 2016. The song peaked at number 3 on the French Singles Chart.
 "You Remain" was released as the fourth single from the album on 27 October 2016. The song peaked at number 45 on the French Singles Chart.

Track listing

Samples
"When You're Gone" contains a sample from "Lost Boy", written by Grace Allison Kelly, Joe Spargur & Eric Tobias Wincorn.
"I Feel So Bad" contains a sample from "You Made Us Change", written by Nicholas Hillman.

Personnel
Adapted credits from the media notes of Layers.

 Kungs: programming, engineering, mixing
 Rainer Rütsch: additional mix and mastering
 Julien Courtois: additional mix and mastering (track 2)
 Nathaniel N.M. Robert: creative direction
 Romain Staros: photography

Charts

Weekly charts

Year-end charts

Certifications

Release history

References

2016 debut albums
Kungs albums